Alfaro is a genus of poeciliid fishes endemic to Central America. The generic name honours the Costa Rican archaeologist, geologist, ethnologist, zoologist and Director of the National Museum of Costa Rica, Anastasio Alfaro (1865-1951).

Species
There are currently two recognized species in this genus:
 Alfaro cultratus (Regan, 1908)
 Alfaro huberi (Fowler, 1923)

References

Poeciliidae
Alfaro (fish)
Fish of Central America
Freshwater fish genera
Taxa named by Seth Eugene Meek
Ray-finned fish genera